Englehardt may refer to:

People
 Elaine Englehardt, American philosopher
 Fred Englehardt (1879-1942), American long and triple jumper
 John Englehardt, (born 1987), American fiction writer and educator

Companies
 Englehardt-Link, American producer of basses and cellos

See also
 Engelhardt
 Engelhart
 Englehart